Shearman is an English surname, which may be pronounced as "Sherman" (as for example with John Shearman). Notable people with the surname include:

Ben Shearman (1884–1958), English footballer
Billy Shearman, English footballer
Bob Shearman (1939–1999), Australian rules footballer
Donald Shearman (born 1926), Australian Anglican bishop
Edward James Shearman (1798–1878), British surgeon and writer
Ernest Charles Shearman (1859–1939), British architect
James Shearman, English conductor, orchestrator and composer
John Shearman (1931–2003), English art historian
John Francis Shearman (1831–1885), Irish priest, antiquarian and historian
Linda Shearman, British ice dancer
Martin Shearman, British diplomat
Montague Shearman (1857–1930), English judge and athlete
Robert Shearman, English writer
Robert Clarke Shearman (1825–1910), New Zealand policeman and farmer
Russell Shearman (died in 1956), American special effects artist
Simon Shearman (born 1964), English cricketer
William Shearman (1767–1861), British physician and medical writer

See also
A Tribute to Buzz Shearman, album by the Canadian rock group Moxy
Shearman & Sterling, New York law firm
shearman, a cloth-finisher

English-language surnames